

This is a list of the National Register of Historic Places listings in Cedar County, Nebraska.

This is intended to be a complete list of the properties and districts on the National Register of Historic Places in Cedar County, Nebraska, United States.  The locations of National Register properties and districts for which the latitude and longitude coordinates are included below, may be seen in a map.

There are 14 properties and districts listed on the National Register in the county.  One property was once listed on the register, but has since been removed.

Current listings

|}

Former listings

|}

See also
 List of National Historic Landmarks in Nebraska
 National Register of Historic Places listings in Nebraska

References

External links

 –Nebraska State Historical Society

 
Cedar